Humphrey High School was a public secondary school in Humphrey, Arkansas, located in Arkansas County. The Humphrey School District merged with DeWitt School District and now students attend DeWitt High School.

External links
Great Schools Profile for Humphrey High School 

Defunct schools in Arkansas
Schools in Arkansas County, Arkansas